Soundmixshow is a Dutch talent show which was a live-vocals version of the Playback Show. It aired from 17 November 1985 to 27 April 2002 and was hosted by Henny Huisman. The format has since been sold to other countries, notably as the European Soundmix Show.

History

Early days
Huisman, former drummer of 1970s band Lucifer and spin-off group Match, toured the early 1980s with his Hitkrant Drive-In Show; this prototype-version of the Playback-show was a joint venture with weekly pop-magazine Hitkrant in which he had a column. In 1983, Huisman brought the format on television during the summer-evening slot as KRO's Zomeravondshow; contestants performed on a hit-or-miss basis.

Breakthrough
In 1984 the name was changed to Playbackshow and contestants were now given full performance time. Soon afterwards Huisman decided to do a spin-off with real vocals; thus the Soundmixshow was born with artists being judged by a jury of three professionals notably Jacques d'Ancona and Barry Stevens; the latter's "Vooral doorgaan!" ("Keep up the good work!") became a catchphrase.

The Soundmixshow meant a breakthrough for several young Dutch artists, as it was a platform with a relative low threshold and a broad audience. The Soundmixshow was first produced by Endemol for Katholieke Radio Omroep (KRO) and afterwards for RTL 4 from 1990 until 2002.

In the finals of 1988, Huisman asked viewers to phone a specific number for televoting. However, this caused such a big amount of phone calls, that the whole telephone grid was down for a while, and even the emergency services (police, ambulance, firefighters) were out of reach in some parts of the country.

Other spin-offs
From the latter half of the 1980s till the early 1990s, Huisman presented the Miniplaybackshow as a platform for children; a Minisoundmixshow was announced, but it never happened.

There was also a Seniorenplaybackshow with  elder contestants, and more successfully the Sterrensoundmixshow (Celebrity Stars In Their Eyes).

In 2002, the Soundmixshow was the platform for a debate between politicians just before the parliamental elections.

Aftermath
In 2002, the format was discontinued in favor of Idols and other talent contests. Huisman reunited with former Soundmixshow-contestants on KRO's anniversary-programme in 2010. He used the backdrop whilst playing himself in a children's movie chronicling the events of two aspiring popstars. In 2014, Huisman appeared on the Showtime programme to revisit his time as presenter of Soundmixshow.

Successful contestants

Kate Ryan
Petra Berger
Marco Borsato
Tooske Breugem
Georgie Davis
Glennis Grace
Gerard Joling
Helmut Lotti
Désirée Manders
Edsilia Rombley

List of winners

International versions

Spain's Antena 3 created a similar format, under the title Tu cara me suena, in 2011. A UK version of this was also produced by ITV in 2013 and, like Stars in Their Eyes and Soundmixshow, is also a format owned by Endemol Shine Group. Another similar format, Starstruck, was launched by ITV in 2022.

References

1980s Dutch television series
1990s Dutch television series
2000s Dutch television series
1985 Dutch television series debuts
2002 Dutch television series endings
Dutch music television series
Dutch reality television series
Dutch-language television shows
Singing talent shows
European Soundmix Show
Television series by Endemol